Mimmi Löfwenius (born 16 February 1994) is a Swedish football midfielder, currently playing for LSK Kvinner in the Toppserien.

She won the 2012 UEFA Women's Under-19 Championship in Turkey with Sweden U19 national team.,

In 2009 Löfwenius collapsed during a match and was diagnosed with cardiac dysrhythmia. Although doctors advised her to quit football, she carried on and signed for Dalsjöfors GoIF in 2010. After impressing in the 2011 Damallsvenskan season Löfwenius joined Kopparbergs/Göteborg FC ahead of 2012. She left part way through the season, for Jitex BK, hoping to get more playing time.

References

External links
 

1994 births
Living people
Swedish women's footballers
Jitex BK players
Damallsvenskan players
BK Häcken FF players
Dalsjöfors GoIF players
Expatriate women's footballers in Norway
Toppserien players
LSK Kvinner FK players
Lyn Fotball Damer players
Swedish expatriate women's footballers
Swedish expatriate sportspeople in Norway
Women's association football midfielders
People from Alingsås